The Local Interstellar Cloud (LIC), also known as the Local Fluff, is an interstellar cloud roughly  across, through which the Solar System is moving. This feature overlaps a region around the Sun referred to as the solar neighborhood. It is unknown whether the Sun is embedded in the Local Interstellar Cloud, or is in the region where the Local Interstellar Cloud is interacting with the neighboring G-Cloud. Like the G-Cloud and others, the LIC is part of the Very Local Interstellar Medium which begins where the heliosphere and interplanetary medium end, the furthest that probes have traveled.

Structure
The Solar System is located within a structure called the Local Bubble, a low-density region of the galactic interstellar medium.  Within this region is the Local Interstellar Cloud (LIC), an area of slightly higher hydrogen density. It is estimated that the Solar System entered the LIC within the past 10,000 years.
It is uncertain whether the Sun is still inside of the LIC or has already entered a transition zone between the LIC and the G cloud.
A recent analysis estimates the Sun will completely exit the LIC in no more than 1900 years.

This is less dense than the average for the interstellar medium in the Milky Way, though six times denser than the gas in the hot, low-density Local Bubble which surrounds the local cloud.

The cloud is flowing outwards from the Scorpius–Centaurus association, a stellar association that is a star-forming region, roughly perpendicular to the Sun's own direction, if assumed to be two dimensional.

In 2019, researchers found interstellar iron-60 (60Fe) in Antarctica, which they relate to the Local Interstellar Cloud.

Interaction with solar magnetic field
In 2009, Voyager 2 data suggested that the magnetic strength of the local interstellar medium was much stronger than expected (370 to 550 picoteslas (pT), against previous estimates of 180 to 250 pT). The fact that the Local Interstellar Cloud is strongly magnetized could explain its continued existence despite the pressures exerted upon it by the winds that blew out the Local Bubble.

The Local Interstellar Cloud's potential effects on Earth are greatly diminished by the solar wind and the Sun's magnetic field. This interaction with the heliosphere is under study by the Interstellar Boundary Explorer (IBEX), a NASA satellite mapping the boundary between the Solar System and interstellar space.

See also

 Gould Belt
 List of nearest stars and brown dwarfs
 List of nearby stellar associations and moving groups
 Orion Arm
 Perseus Arm
 Voyager program – probes left heliosphere in the 2010s

References

Further reading
"A Breeze from the Stars" at NASA Science
"Voyager Makes an Interstellar Discovery" at NASA Science
"Local Chimney and Superbubbles"

External links